Hardt is a municipality in the district of Rottweil, in Baden-Württemberg, Germany.

History
Schramberg was dissolved by the process of German mediatization in 1806 and its territories were awarded to the Kingdom of Württemberg. Hardt was subsequently assigned to a new Oberamt, . In 1839, Hardt became an independent municipality. The district of Oberndorf was dissolved on 1 October 1938, and Hardt returned to the jurisdiction of Rottweil.

Geography
Hardt is physically located in the Central Black Forest. Elevation above sea level in the municipal area ranges from a high of  Normalnull (NN) at the Hochwald to a low of  NN on the Kirnbach at the border with Schramberg.

Coat of arms
Hardt's coat of arms depicts, in green, a field with two fir trees upon a field of white. Between the trees is a smaller blazon with a stag upon a trimount, both in yellow, upon a field of blue. This pattern was devised in 1953 from a Schultheißs seal that featured the firs, but was distinguished from similar coats of arms by the addition of the arms of the House of Falkenstein. The arms of the 17th century Falkenstein zu Rimsingen line are erroneously used on Hardt's coat of arms.

References

External links
  (in German)

Rottweil (district)